Mormodes luxata is a species of orchid endemic to southwestern Mexico.

References

luxata
Endemic orchids of Mexico
Plants described in 1842